General Grant Mine is a heritage-listed mine off Dimbulah - Mount Mulligan Road, Kingsborough, Shire of Mareeba, Queensland, Australia. It was added to the Queensland Heritage Register on 21 October 1992.

History 
The Hodgkinson Goldfield was proclaimed on 15 June 1876. Although the Hodgkinson was geologically similar to the great alluvial gold field to the north, the Palmer, it was predominantly a reefing field with its major mines in the vicinity of the now abandoned townships of Kingsborough, Thornborough and Northcote. It was a neglected field through lack of capital, and although there was an optimistic outlook until the first decade of the twentieth century, it was clear by 1908 that its small yield no longer justified separate goldfield administration and accordingly, in 1909 it was incorporated into the Chillagoe Gold and Mineral field.

The General Grant reef up to the end of 1882 recorded seventeen crushings totalling  of ore yielding  of gold. The workings remained idle between 1883 and 1893, but in the next two years produced  of ore yielding .

The revival was unexpected, but the opening of the Tablelands railway from Cairns to Mareeba in 1893 had made the field more accessible and increased use of cyanding promised improved returns for reefing fields. The real impetus came in 1897 when the British group, the Cecil Syndicate focused on the General Grant mine.

In 1902, when the shaft reached the reef at the  level the syndicate decided to erect a battery at the mine and constructed a  capacity dam. However crushing from the mine did not even recoup the  outlaid on the construction of the dam, battery and cyanide plant.

Intermittent working resulted in the shaft reaching the  level by 1937 when it was owned by the Hodgkinson Gold Development Syndicate Limited. The reef was under consideration for dewatering and re-opening in late 1944, when it was thought that at least  of ore, with an average grade of  gold, remained and although the grade is said to have improved at the bottom of the workings, it was not economical. Several small prospecting efforts have been carried out since.

Description 

The place includes a large winding shed, workshop, and two mine shafts situated on a terrace, set high on a steep hillside. Extensive mullock dumps extend from both shafts to the base of the hill. The collar of the main shaft has caved and is strewn with the timbers of a recently collapsed headframe.

The winding shed is constructed of heavy round timber uprights supporting a sawn timber frame. The building and adjacent workshop are corrugated iron clad. The building contains a winding engine, an intact Babcock boiler in a brick mount, a compressor and an air receiver. The Babcock & Wilcox boiler is equipped with a high steel chimney.

The surviving plant includes:
 One-cylinder air compressor - R.Schran & Co. Engineers London
 Babcock & Wilcox boiler - no brand
 Two-cylinder steam winding engine - Walkers Limited Queensland No 870 1908
 2 Colonial boilers (one not in situ) 
 Egg-end air receiver.

Heritage listing 
General Grant Mine was listed on the Queensland Heritage Register on 21 October 1992 having satisfied the following criteria.

The place is important in demonstrating the evolution or pattern of Queensland's history.

The General Grant Mine is significant in Queensland's history because it was a major producer of reef gold on the Hodgkinson field between 1878 and 1910.

The place demonstrates rare, uncommon or endangered aspects of Queensland's cultural heritage.

In addition, the winding shed is one of two surviving in North Queensland housing an intact range of early winding plant. (The other is located at the Great Northern Mine, Herberton) The Walkers winding engine is one of the most intact examples surveyed, while the Schran air compressor is rare. The Babcock and Wilcox boiler in its brick housing is the only intact example surviving in the Mareeba Mining District.

The place is important in demonstrating the principal characteristics of a particular class of cultural places.

Isolation and difficult access has ensured the survival in situ of this representative and now rare mine haulage plant.

References

Attribution

External links 

Queensland Heritage Register
Kingsborough, Queensland
Mines in Queensland
Articles incorporating text from the Queensland Heritage Register
Buildings and structures in Far North Queensland